Real Hasta la Muerte is the debut studio album by Puerto Rican rapper Anuel AA. Released on July 17, 2018, under the label Real Hasta la Muerte, the album features 12 tracks, and features collaborations with urban artists such as Zion, Wisin, Ozuna and Ñengo Flow. It was released hours before Anuel AA left jail and on September 18, 2018, the RIAA certified Real Hasta la Muerte Platinum.

Production 
Anuel AA, working with "Joshi", conceived and recorded the entire album while he was in prison. Due to his imprisonment, he did not give any interviews about the project.

Although the singer's lawyer, Edwin Prado, had anticipated the media that his client kept working from prison to get a production, the exclusive that the album would be released on the day of Anuel AA's release from prison was published by Billboard magazine. The publication anticipated that on the 18th there would be a complete and in-depth interview with the trap singer.

Critical reception

Track listing

Charts

Weekly charts

Year-end charts

Certifications

References 

2018 debut albums
Anuel AA albums